Suharu may refer to several villages in Romania:

 Suharu, a village in Vela Commune, Dolj County
 Suharu, a village in Căzănești Commune, Mehedinți County